Parliamentary elections were held in Greece on 20 November 1977. After Prime Minister Constantine Karamanlis called for early elections, his New Democracy party suffered a significant loss of power. However, Karamanlis managed to secure an absolute majority in the Parliament. The big surprise was the success of PASOK, whose socialistic rhetoric remained radical. Because of PASOK's success, the Centrists (Union of the Democratic Centre, ΕDIK, former Center Union - New Forces) led again by Georgios Mavros lost half of their power. As a result, Andreas Papandreou, PASOK's leader, became a prominent figure in Greek politics. The Communists (Communist Party of Greece) and the Nationalists managed to amplify their support.

Future Prime Minister of Greece, Antonis Samaras first won a seat in parliament at this election.

Results

Aftermath
In 1979 Greece became European Community's 10th member, despite the opposition of PASOK and the Communists. In October 1980 Greece rejoined NATO military structure. In 1980, Constantine Karamanlis succeeded Constantine Tsatsos as President of the Republic. George Rallis became Prime Minister and new leader of ND.

References

Parliamentary elections in Greece
Greece
Legislative
1970s in Greek politics
Greece
Konstantinos Karamanlis